Etz Chaim Yeshiva (Yeshivat Etz Hayyim, lit. "Tree of Life") is an orthodox yeshiva located on Jaffa Road close to the Mahane Yehuda Market in downtown Jerusalem.

History

Etz Chaim Yeshiva was originally a Talmud Torah that was established in 1841 by the Chief Rabbi of Jerusalem, Shmuel Salant. For the first two years classes were held in various rooms throughout the Old City. In 1857, the yeshiva consolidated into a group of buildings adjacent to the Hurva Synagogue, sharing the premises with the Beth Din of Jerusalem. It was at this stage that the institution was renamed "Etz Chaim Yeshiva." The first permanent home of the yeshiva was financed by Rabbi Tzvi Zeev Fiszbejn (Fishbein in English), a wealthy brush maker originally from Miedzyrzec Podlaski in what is today Poland, who donated a thousand rubles in silver to Rabbi Salant for that purpose in 1863.

Moshe Nechemiah Kahanov led the school from 1867 to his death in 1886 and was as concerned with the progress of his average students as with the gifted. 

The head teacher was Rabbi Chaim Mann. His brother Yehuda Leib Mann was the secretary who also served as a teacher. They were the sons of Rabbi Yaakov Mann, who was a prominent scholar who had declined the invitation of Rabbi Tzvi Pesach Frank to become a dayan on the Beth Din. (He went on to build the Sha'arey Tzedek Medical Center and the Lemel school). 

As the yeshiva expanded, a plot of land on Jaffa Road was acquired in 1908, and subsequently a kollel was established, catering mainly to the alumni of the yeshiva. At the time, Rabbi Yechiel Michel Tucazinsky, who was married to the granddaughter of Rabbi Salant, served as the rosh yeshiva.

After disputes arose between the pupils and the faculty, a permanent agreement was reached by Rabbi Tzvi Pesach Frank, who reallocated the positions of authority.

In 1925, Rabbi Isser Zalman Meltzer was appointed to lead the yeshiva and Rabbi Aryeh Levin was made the mashgiach. After the death of Rabbi Meltzer, his son-in-law, Rabbi Aharon Kotler, was appointed rosh yeshiva. In an unusual arrangement, he held this position while continuing to live in the United States, and visited Jerusalem on occasion. During the periods when he resided in Israel, he delivered fortnightly lectures. 

After his death, Rabbi Elazar Shach was chosen to head the yeshiva, and he also delivered fortnightly lectures. Some time later, Rabbi Yisroel Yaakov Fisher took up a position at the yeshiva. A grandson of Rabbi Aharon Kotler, Rabbi Zvulun Schwartzman, has served as one of the primary leaders.

A great-grandson of Rabbi Salant, Rabbi Nissan Tikochinsky, the son of Rabbi Yechiel Michel Tucazinsky, served as head and director of the institution until his death in 2012. For many years he traveled to the United States and South Africa to raise money to keep the institution functioning.

Threat of demolition
Although the yeshiva building on Jaffa Road is registered on Jerusalem's List of Protected Monuments, in 2007 the building was under the threat of demolition to make way for shops and offices. The authorities accepted an appeal for the buildings' preservation.

Notable students

 Ernest Krausz (1931-2018), Israeli professor of sociology and President at Bar Ilan University
 Rabbi Shlomo Zalman Auerbach (1910-1995)
 Rabbi Yitzchak Dovid Grossman

References

External links
 Etz Chaim website

Orthodox yeshivas in Jerusalem
Educational institutions established in 1841
Yishuv